Bradwell railway station was a railway station on the Wolverton–Newport Pagnell line. It served both Bradwell and the new village of New Bradwell in Buckinghamshire. The station, which consisted of a brick-built station building, and single platform, opened to traffic in 1867.

The last passenger train ran on 5 September 1964 but freight trains continued to pass through until 22 May 1967. The station building was demolished although the platform remains intact. The trackbed through the station has been converted into a shared path (footpath/cycle way), forming part of the Milton Keynes redway system.

Services

References

External links 
 Station on Disused Stations
 The station on navigable 1946 O. S. map
Station history

Disused railway stations in Buckinghamshire
Railway stations in Great Britain closed in 1964
Beeching closures in England
Railway stations in Great Britain opened in 1867
Former London and North Western Railway stations
Railway stations in Milton Keynes